Sinem Ünsal (born 21 June 1993) is a Turkish actress, best known for her role in the TV series Kızım, Siyah Beyaz Aşk and Mucize Doktor.

Life 
Ünsal was born on 21 June 1993 in İzmir as the second child of her family. Her mother is of Circassian descent, while her father is of Azerbaijani descent. She is a graduate of Eskişehir Osmangazi University with a degree in Comparative Literature. She started her career as an actress in 2017. In the 2017 series Çoban Yıldızı, she portrayed the character of Güneş, and in the same year she joined the cast of Siyah Beyaz Aşk, playing the role of Gülsüm Aslan. Between 2018 and 2019, she was a regular in the series Kızım, playing the role of Sevgi Günay. Her breakthrough came in 2019 with a leading role in Mucize Doktor, an adaptation of the South Korean TV series Good Doctor.

Filmography

Television

Theatre

Awards and nominations

References

External links 
 
 

Living people
1993 births
Turkish television actresses
Turkish people of Azerbaijani descent
Turkish people of Circassian descent
21st-century Turkish actresses